Kit Woolsey (born Christopher Robin Woolsey in 1943) is an American bridge and backgammon player. He was inducted into the ACBL Hall of Fame in 2005.

Personal life

Woolsey was born in Washington, DC. He graduated from Oberlin College in 1964 and earned a master's degree in mathematics from the University of Illinois at Urbana–Champaign in 1965. He lives in Kensington, California with his wife, world champion finalist bridge player Sally Woolsey.

Career

In bridge, he was the winner of the 1986 Rosenblum Cup world teams championship. He was also runner-up in the 1982 Rosenblum Cup, 1989 Bermuda Bowl and won the Senior Teams at the 2000 World Team Olympiad, and another gold at the 2003 Senior Bowl, as well as more than a dozen American Contract Bridge League (ACBL) North American Bridge Championships (NABC-level) events. Many of his successes were in partnership with Ed Manfield. He is a World Bridge Federation (WBF) World Grand Master and was Inducted into the ACBL Hall of Fame in 2005. In backgammon he was runner-up in the 1996 World Cup; as of 2007 he was the 5th-rank player in the world. 

Woolsey has written many bridge and backgammon books, and contributed to the bridge bidding theory with innovations including the two-way checkback convention and  Woolsey, a defense against opposing notrump openings. He won the 1978 International Bridge Press Association (IBPA) award for Best Article or Series on a System or Convention.  Since 1984, Woolsey has been one of four (before 2005) or six rotating directors of  The Bridge World'''s monthly Master Solvers Club.

Kit Woolsey is editor of the online backgammon magazine GammOnLine. As of May 2014, the annotated match in the free "Demo issue" is "from 1996 World Cup finals between Malcolm Davis and Kit Woolsey".

Kit's wife Sally Woolsey was player-captain of the runner-up team, or losing finalist, for the inaugural, 1994 McConnell Cup"Results & Participants, McConnell Cup". 9th World Championships (1994). WBF. Retrieved 2014-05-22.—a quadrennial world championship event for women that runs to parallel to the open Rosenblum Cup he won in 1986. From 1998 they have played together in all four Mixed Pairs championships at the same convention, now called the World Bridge Series Championships (within the bridge world, World Series for short).

Bridge accomplishments

Honors
 ACBL Hall of Fame, 2005
American Backgammon Hall of Fame, 2015

Awards
 Herman Trophy 1986
 Precision Award (Best Article or Series on a System or Convention) 1978

Wins
 Rosenblum Cup (1) 1986
 Senior Bowl (1) 2003
 Senior International Cup (1) 2000
 North American Bridge Championships (19)
 Vanderbilt (1) 1991
 Grand National Teams (3) 1984, 2009, 2017
 Open Board-a-Match Teams (1) 1994
 Men's Board-a-Match Teams (3) 1978, 1986, 1989
 North American Men's Swiss Teams (2) 1986, 2012
 Blue Ribbon Pairs (3) 1973, 1975, 1990
 Open Pairs (2) 1987, 1989
 Men's Pairs (2) 1972, 1985
 Mixed Pairs (1) 1967
Baze Senior Knockout Teams (1) 2012
 United States Bridge Championships (6)
 Open Team Trials (2) 1989, 2009
 Senior Team Trials (4) 2000, 2001, 2003, 2019
 Other notable wins:
 Cavendish Invitational Teams (1) 1990
 Reisinger Knockout Teams (1) 1981
 Cavendish Invitational Pairs (3) 1979, 1994, 2011

Runners-up
 Bermuda Bowl (1) 1989
 Rosenblum Cup (1) 1982
 North American Bridge Championships (22)
 Vanderbilt (2) 1992, 1999
 Spingold (3) 1979, 1981, 1992
 Reisinger (1) 1980
 Grand National Teams (4) 1977, 2006, 2014, 2016
 Mixed Board-a-Match Teams (1) 1997
 Blue Ribbon Pairs (3) 1985, 1986, 2002
 Life Master Men's Pairs (2) 1971, 1972
 Open Pairs (1) 1981
 Open Pairs I (1) 1996
 Open Pairs II (1) 2004
 Men's Pairs (2) 1973, 1974
Base Senior Knockout Teams (1) 2010
Freeman Mixed Board-a-Match (1) 2010
 United States Bridge Championships (1)
 Open Team Trials (1) 2005
 Other notable 2nd places:
 Cavendish Invitational Teams (1) 1999
 EOE Optiebeurs Pairs (1) 1990
 Cavendish Invitational Pairs (1) 1980
 Goldman Pairs (2) 1980, 1982

Publications
Bridge
  — (reprinted 1988 and 1992) Louisville, KY: Devyn Press Inc., pp. 343, OCLC 477153995.
  — (reprinted 1991), pp. 303, .
  — (reprinted 1992) Louisville, KY: Devyn Press Inc., pp. 64, .
  — (reprinted 1980). — (2nd edition 1983), Louisville: Devyn Press Inc., pp. 32. OCLC 10409994. — (reprinted 1990), pp 32.

 The Language of Bridge. Bridge winners. 2017

BackgammonNew Ideas in Backgammon (with Hal Heinrich)How to Play Tournament BackgammonBackgammon: Master Versus Amateur, Volume 1MatchQiz Book: Greiner vs Phillip MarmorsteinMatchQiz Book: Hal Heinrich vs. Mika LidovMatchQiz Book: Joe Sylvester vs. Nack BallardUnderstanding Backgammon (with Tami Jones)52 Great Backgammon Tips (with Patti Beadles)The Backgammon Encyclopedia, Volume 1: Cube Reference PositionsThe Backgammon Encyclopedia, Volume 2: More Cube Reference Positions''

References

External links 
 
 
 
  

1943 births
American contract bridge players
Bermuda Bowl players
American backgammon players
Contract bridge writers
Oberlin College alumni
University of Illinois Urbana-Champaign alumni
People from Washington, D.C.
People from Kensington, California
Living people
Date of birth missing (living people)